Nanjirinji is an administrative ward in Kilwa District of Lindi Region in Tanzania. 
According to the 2012 census, the ward has a total population of 7,491. The ward seat is Nanjirinji village. Nanjirinji ward is also the source of the Mavuji River.

References

Wards of Kilwa District
Wards of Lindi Region